Giuseppe Bossi (11 August 1777 – 9 November 1815) was an Italian painter, arts administrator and writer on art. He ranks among the foremost figures of Neoclassical culture in Lombardy, along with Ugo Foscolo, Giuseppe Parini, Andrea Appiani or Manzoni.

Biography
He was born in the town of Busto Arsizio, near Milan. He was educated at the college of Monza; and his early fondness for drawing was fostered by the director of the college. He then studied at the Brera Academy of Fine Arts at Milan, and spent the years 1795 to 1801 in Rome, where he drew Roman remains and honed his skills in drawing anatomy at the morgue of a hospital and formed an intimate friendship with Canova, who made a portrait bust of Bossi . He met Jacques-Louis David in Lyon in 1802, though his own style employed a less rigorously classicizing technique.

On his return to Milan he fell in with the circle of progressive young artists that formed the Cameretta Portiana. He became assistant secretary, and then secretary (1802–1807) of the Brera Academy, whose collection of paintings, the Pinacoteca he essentially founded. In 1804, in conjunction with Barnabo Oriani, he drew up revised organizational rules for the three academies of art of Bologna, Venice and Milan, which lent weight to the need for public collections of great examples of the arts, which were being supplied from the dissolved monasteries and secularized churches of Lombardy, under Napoleonic administration. He was rewarded with the Order of the Iron Crown. On the occasion of the visit of Napoleon to Milan in 1805, Bossi exhibited at the Pinacoteca a drawing of the Last Judgment of Michelangelo, and paintings representing Aurora and Night, Oedipus and Creon, and the Italian Parnassus.

By command of prince Eugène de Beauharnais, viceroy of Italy, Bossi undertook to make a copy of The Last Supper of Leonardo da Vinci, then almost obliterated, for the purpose of getting it rendered in mosaic. The drawing was made from the remains of the original with the aid of copies and the best prints. The mosaic, 9.18 m in length, was executed by the Roman mosaicist Giacomo Raffaelli, and was placed in the Minoritenkirche, Vienna. Bossi made another copy in oil, which was placed in the Pinacoteca Brera. The Brera Academy owed to him its fine collection of casts of great works of sculpture acquired at Paris, Rome and Florence. For himself, Bossi collected books, drawings, prints, paintings, coins, sculptures, and antiquities.

Bossi devoted a large part of his life to the study of the works of Leonardo, whose drawing manner he imitated accurately enough for his productions to have passed as Leonardos. and his last work was a series of drawings in monochrome representing incidents in the life of that great master. He left unfinished a large cartoon in black chalk of the Dead Christ in the bosom of Mary, with John and the Magdalene. In 1810 he published a special work in large quarto, entitled Del Cenacolo di Leonardo da Vinci, which had the merit of greatly interesting Goethe, who shared Bossi's urgent dream of saving Leonardo's fresco.

Bossi's other publications were Delle Opinioni di Leonardo intorno alla simmetria de corpi umani (1811), and Del Tipo dell'arte della pittura (1816). His diary, 1807–1815, is a useful guide to the official artistic life of Napoleonic Milan.

Bossi died at his home in via S. Maria Valle, Milan. A monument by Canova was erected to his memory in the Biblioteca Ambrosiana, and a bust was placed in the Brera.

Notes

References 
 
 Getty Museum: Giuseppe Bossi: a sheet of studies
 Commemorative plaque on Bossi's Milan residence: gives birth date 11.viii.1777 and death date 9.xi.1815

Further reading 
 (Chiara Nenci, editor), 2004. Le memorie di Giuseppe Bossi: Diario di un artista nella Milano napoleonica 1807-1815  (Milan: Jaca Book)

1777 births
1815 deaths
People from the Province of Varese
Italian art historians
18th-century Italian painters
Italian male painters
19th-century Italian painters
Italian neoclassical painters
Western Lombard language
Brera Academy alumni
Academic staff of Brera Academy
19th-century Italian male artists
18th-century Italian male artists